The Singapore sling is a gin-based sling cocktail from Singapore. This long drink was developed sometime before 1915 by Ngiam Tong Boon, a bartender at the Long Bar in Raffles Hotel, Singapore. It was initially called the gin sling (a sling was originally a North American drink composed of spirit and water, sweetened and flavored).

History
D. A. Embury stated in the Fine Art of Mixing Drinks: "Of all the recipes published for [this drink] I have never seen any two that were alike." The Times described the "original recipe" as a mixture of two measures of gin with one of cherry brandy and one each of orange, pineapple, and lime juice. An alternative "original recipe" used gin, Cherry Heering, Bénédictine, and fresh pineapple juice, primarily from Sarawak (or "smooth cayenne") pineapples, which enhances the flavor and creates a foamy top.  The hotel's recipe was recreated based on the memories of former bartenders and written notes that they discovered regarding the original recipe.

Present-day style

By the 1980s, in countries such as the United States, the Singapore sling was often little more than gin, bottled sweet and sour, and grenadine, a recipe showing very little relationship to the recipe used elsewhere under the same name. By that time both in Raffles Hotel, Hong Kong and generally in the UK the recipe had remained standardised as gin and cherry brandy (in various ratios between 2:1 and 1:2).  By 2000, one started to see the introduction of benedictine and the wider use of pineapple juice. In New Orleans, sometimes Hurricane mix was used instead of pineapple.

Nowadays and internationally, it is helpful to specify the era of the drink or your personal recipe if you wish to get anything close to your expectations.

Gin slings
The gin sling, attested from 1790, described a North American drink of gin which was flavoured, sweetened and served cold. The Singapore sling has been documented as early as 1930 as a recipe in the Savoy Cocktail Book; Ingredients ¼ lemon juice, ¼ Dry Gin, ½ Cherry Brandy: "Shake well and strain into medium size glass, and fill with soda water. Add 1 lump of ice".

This recipe persisted for decades and is recalled in 1982 in The Sainsbury Book of Cocktails & Party Drinks
where it is also called the Singapore sling and was the classic recipe of the time.  There is a minor difference in that the measure of spirits were twice the quantity compared with the lemon and soda of the 1930 quotation and garnished with slice of lemon and a glacé cherry. These two very similar forms represent a traditional British version of the Singapore sling.

Also documented in The Sainsbury Book of Cocktails & Party Drinks is the Straits sling (also a Raffles Hotel invention named after the nearby Singapore Strait) which was even stronger but also added Bénédictine, Angostura bitters, and orange bitters, but its garnish was both lemon and orange slices and it did not have the glacé cherry.

Brewer's Dictionary of Phrase and Fable (Brewer's) refers to the gin sling as "a drink mainly composed of gin and lemon" and states that it has been attributed to bartender John Collins of London, "but it dates from before his time and was found in the U.S.A. by 1800" which is similar to the John Collins, another cocktail of gin and lemon.

Variations
The Chinatown sling contains gin, triple sec, Bénédictine, Angostura bitters, Cherry Heering, pineapple juice, pineapple spears, and maraschino cherries.

See also

 Tom Collins
 John Collins
 List of cocktails

References

Further reading
 "The Sainsbury's Book of Cocktails and Party Drinks", Joe Turner, Cathay Books, 1982
 "The Genealogy and Mythology of the Singapore Sling", Ted "Dr. Cocktail" Haigh, in Mixologist: The Journal of the American Cocktail, 2007, 
Andrew F. Smith: The Oxford Companion to American Food and Drink. Oxford University Press 2007, p. 567
Rob Chirico: Field Guide to Cocktails: How to Identify and Prepare Virtually Every Mixed Drink at the Bar. Quirk Books 2005, p. 257

External links
100th Anniversary of the original Singapore Sling at Raffles Singapore
Singapore Sling recipe at DrinkBoy
 

Cocktails with gin
Singaporean alcoholic drinks
Food and drink introduced in the 1910s
Cocktails with Angostura bitters
Tiki drinks